This article lists agricultural universities, academies / polytechniques and colleges in Indonesia, by region.

Bali and Nusa Tenggara

Bali 

 Udayana University

East Nusa Tenggara 
 Artha Wacana Christian University, Kupang
 Kupang State Agricultural Polytechnique, Kupang
 Nusa Nipa University, Maumere, Flores

West Nusa Tenggara 
 Muhammadiyah University, Mataram
 University of Mataram, Mataram

Java

Banten 
 Indonesian College of Technology, Tangerang
 Jakarta Islamic State University,  Ciputat, South Tangerang
 Sultan Ageng Tirtayasa University, Serang, Banten

Central Java 
 Baruna Fishery Academy, Slawi

 Diponegoro University, Semarang
 Jenderal Soedirman University, Purwokerto
 Satya Wacana Christian University, Salatiga
 Sebelas Maret University, Surakarta
 Slamet Riyadi University, Surakarta
 Soegijapranata Catholic University, Semarang
 Widya Dharma University, Klaten

East Java 
 Brawijaya University, Malang
 Cipta Wacana Christian University, Malang
 Jember State Polytechnique, Jember
 Jember University, Jember
 Malang College of Agriculture, Malang
 Muhammadiyah University, Malang
 PGRI University, Banyuwangi
 Tribhuwana Tungga Dewi University, Malang
 Trunojoyo University, Bangkalan, Madura
 Widya Gama University, Malang

 Wijaya Kusuma University, Surabaya
 Yudharta University, Pasuruan

Jakarta 
 Mercu Buana University

West Java 

 Bogor Agricultural University, Bogor
 Djuanda University, Bogor
 Nusantara Islamic University, Bandung
 Padjadjaran University, Bandung
 Polytechnique of Agroindustry, Subang

 Winaya Mukti University, Sumedang

Yogyakarta 

 Estate Education College, Yogyakarta
 Gadjah Mada University, Yogyakarta
 Institute for Plantation Agriculture (INSTIPER), Yogyakarta
 Janabadra University, Yogyakarta
 National Development University "Veteran", Yogyakarta
 Semarang University, Yogyakarta
 Yogyakarta Institute of Agriculture (INTAN), Yogyakarta

Kalimantan

Central Kalimantan 
 University of Palangka Raya, Palangkaraya
 Christian University of Palangka Raya, Palangkaraya

East Kalimantan 
 East Kutai School of Agriculture, East Kutai Regency
 Mulawarman University, Samarinda
 Samarinda State Agricultural Polytechnique, Samarinda

South Kalimantan 
 Lambung Mangkurat University, Banjarbaru
 Syekh Salman Al-Farisi Islamic Polytechnique, Tapin Regency
 Tanah Laut Polytechnique, Pelaihari, Tanah Laut Regency

West Kalimantan 
 Agribusiness Management Academy, Sanggau
 Bumi Sebalo Agribusiness Academy, Bengkayang
 Tanjungpura University, Pontianak
 Tonggak Ekuator Polytechnique, Pontianak

Mollucas

Maluku 
 University of Pattimura, Ambon

North Maluku 
 Agricultural Faculty Khairun University, Ternate

Papua

Papua 
 Agricultural Polytechnique of Yasanto, Merauke
 Cenderawasih University, Jayapura
 Musamus University, Merauke
 Santo Thomas Aquinas Agricultural College, Jayapura

West Papua 
 State University of Papua, Manokwari

Sulawesi

Central Sulawesi 
 Alkhairaat University, Palu
 College of Fishery and Marine, Palu
 Polytechnique of Palu, Palu
 Tadulako University, Palu

Gorontalo 
 Ichsan University of Gorontalo, Gorontalo
 Polytechnique of Gorontalo, Gorontalo
 University of Gorontalo, Gorontalo
 State University of Gorontalo, Gorontalo

North Sulawesi 
 De La Salle Catholic University, Manado
 Indonesian Christian University, Tomohon
 North Sulawesi Technological University, Manado
 Nusantara University, Manado
 Sam Ratulangi University, Manado
 Sariputra Buddhist University, Tomohon

South East Sulawesi 
 Haluoleo University, Kendari
 Kendari University, Kendari

South Sulawesi 
 Cokroaminoto University, Makassar
 East Indonesia University, Makassar
 Hasanudin University, Makassar
 Pancasakti University, Makassar

West Sulawesi 
 University of West Sulawesi, Mamasa

Sumatra

Aceh 
 Syiah Kuala University, Banda Aceh
 Teuku Umar University, Meulaboh
 University of Serambi Mekah
 Venezuela Polytechnique, Aceh Besar

Bengkulu 
 Bengkulu University, Bengkulu
 Dehasen University, Bengkulu

Jambi 
 Jambi University, Jambi City

Lampung 
 Lampung State Agricultural Polytechnique
 Lampung State Polytechnique
 Lampung University

North Sumatra 
 Agricultural Academy, Gunung Sitoli
 Islamic University of North Sumatra, Medan
 Muhammadiyah University, Medan
 Nommensen HPBP University, Medan
 Preston University, Medan
 Quality University, Medan
 Santo Thomas University, Medan
 Simalungun University, Pematangsiantar
 Tugu 405 Polytechnique, Medan
 University of North Sumatra, Medan

Riau 
 Indragiri Islamic University, Tembilahan
 Pasir Pangaraian University
 Riau University, Pekanbaru

South Sumatra 
 Muhammadiyah University, Palembang
 Sriwijaya University, Palembang
 University of Musi Rawas, Lubuklinggau

West Sumatra 
 Agricultural Development Academy of Lubung Alung, Pariaman
 Andalas University, Padang
 Ekasakti University, Padang
 Payakumbuh State Agricultural Polytechnique, Payakumbuh
 Science and Technology College of Padang, Padang

See also 

 Agriculture in Indonesia
 Education in Indonesia
 List of agricultural universities and colleges
 List of forestry technical schools
 List of forestry universities and colleges
 List of universities in Indonesia

References 

Agriculture in Indonesia
Agricultural Universities And Colleges
Indonesia
Agricultural Universities And Colleges